The Bohol Chronicle, popularly known as the Chronicle, is a daily newspaper in Bohol, Philippines. It also hosted a radio station at DYRD-AM 1161 AM.

History
The Bohol Chronicle was founded on May 16, 1954. 

In 2016, they launched their website.

The newspaper has been awarded numerous times for Best Editorial Page (2012, 2019), Best Disaster Reporting (2013), and Best in Culture and Arts (2014) by the Civic Journalism Community Press Awards.

References

External links
Bohol Chronicle
DYRD-AM

Newspapers published in Bohol
Publications established in 1954